Rock City may refer to:

Places
Rock City (venue), a music venue in Nottingham, England
Rock City, an area in Laventille, Trinidad and Tobago

United States
Rock City (attraction), tourist attraction in Lookout Mountain, Georgia
Rock City, Illinois, village
Rock City, Kansas, National Natural Landmark in Kansas, United States
Rock City, New York, a hamlet in Dutchess County
Rock City Falls, New York, a hamlet in Saratoga County
Rock City Park, New York, a location in Olean (town), New York
Rock City and McCarty Hill State Forests, a location in Little Valley, New York
A nickname for Detroit, Michigan
A nickname for Saint Thomas, U.S. Virgin Islands
A nickname for Gainesville, Florida

Music
"Eindhoven Rockcity", a music scene in The Netherlands that includes bands like Peter Pan Speedrock

Artists
Rock City (band), rock band, progenitor to Big Star
Rock City (duo), musical duo also known as R. City and Planet VI

Albums
Rock City (Riot album), debut album of heavy metal band Riot
Rock City (Royce da 5'9" album), debut album of Detroit rapper Royce da 5'9"
Live at Nottingham Rock City, live album by Tygers of Pan Tang

Songs
"Rock City", a song by Krokus from the 1981 album Hardware
"Rock City" (song), by Royce da 5'9" from the 2002 album Rock City (Version 2.0)
"Detroit Rock City", a 1976 song by rock band Kiss
"Rock City", a song by Kings of Leon from the 2013 album Mechanical Bull
"Gainesville Rock City", a song by Less Than Jake

See also